Caylusea abyssinica is a plant species found in East Africa.

The edible aerial parts are used as a vegetable in Tanzania and Ethiopia.

References

External links
PROTAbase on Caylusea abyssinica
Aluka on Caylusea abyssinia

Resedaceae